Hobgood is a surname. Notable people with the surname include:

C. J. Hobgood, American surfer, 2001 world champion
Damien Hobgood, American professional surfer (twin brother of C.J.)
Justin Hobgood (born 1979), American racing driver
Matt Hobgood (born 1990), American professional baseball pitcher

See also
Nate Hobgood-Chittick (born 1974), American football player